Charim may refer to:

 Harim (biblical figure)
Charim, Uttaradit, Thailand